The 2012 Sanfrecce Hiroshima season is Sanfrecce Hiroshima's fourth consecutive season in J. League Division 1, and 42nd overall in the Japanese top flight. Sanfrecce Hiroshima are also competing in the 2012 Emperor's Cup and 2012 J. League Cup.

Players

Competitions

J. League

League table

Matches

J. League Cup

Emperor's Cup

References

External links
2012 Sanfrecce Hiroshima at Soccerway

Sanfrecce Hiroshima
Sanfrecce Hiroshima seasons